Spanish Affair may refer to:
 Spanish Affair (1957 film), an American–Spanish drama film
 Spanish Affair (2014 film), a Spanish comedy film